HMAS Hobart (DDG 39), named after the city of Hobart, Tasmania, is the lead ship of the Hobart-class air warfare destroyers used by the Royal Australian Navy (RAN). The ship, based on the Álvaro de Bazán-class frigate designed by Navantia, was built at ASC's shipyard in Osborne, South Australia from modules fabricated by ASC, BAE Systems Australia in Victoria, and Forgacs Group in New South Wales. Hobart was ordered in 2007, but errors and delays in construction caused extensive schedule slippage. Despite commissioning initially planned for December 2014, the ship was not laid down until September 2012, and launched in May 2015. The Department of Defence accepted delivery of HMAS Hobart on 16 June 2017. The ship was commissioned on 23 September 2017.

Construction
The ship was assembled from 31 pre-fabricated modules ('blocks'): 12 for the hull, 9 for the forward superstructure, and 10 for the aft superstructure. Modules were fabricated by ASC in South Australia, BAE Systems Australia in Victoria, and Forgacs Group in New South Wales, with final assembly of the ship at ASC's shipyard in Osborne, South Australia. Delays and project slippage resulted in the redistribution of block construction across the three shipbuilders, and the bow hull block was constructed by Navantia.

In October 2010, the  central keel block for Hobart was found to be distorted and incompatible with other hull sections. Incorrect drawings from designer Navantia and first-of-kind manufacturing errors by manufacturer BAE were blamed, and the delay in reworking the block set construction back at least six months. Other major issues during construction included the need to replace 25% of the destroyer's internal pipework due to faulty manufacture, and the initial rejection of the ship's mainmast block because of defects in the cabling and combat system equipment.

Hobarts keel was laid down on 6 September 2012. The ship was launched on 23 May 2015, with 76% of construction complete. Construction of Hobart and her sister ships saw numerous delays: a planned December 2014 commissioning for Hobart was pushed back in September 2012 to March 2016, then again in May 2015 to delivery in June 2017. As of October 2015, construction of Hobart was estimated to be 30 months behind schedule and $870 million over budget. Sea trials were completed in September 2016. Hobart was handed over to the Navy in June 2017, and was commissioned on 23 September 2017 with the designation Guided missile destroyer 'DDG' and assigned the pennant number '39'.

Operational service
Hobart conducted a five month deployment to the United States during late 2018 which was undertaken to test her combat systems. During the deployment the ship completed a range of intensive trials, and fired multiple missiles.

Hobart commenced her first operational deployment in late September 2019. During this deployment she served as the flagship for a RAN task group in Northern and South-East Asia. Hobart was one of the Australian ships which participated in the RIMPAC 2020 exercise in mid-2020. This was undertaken as part of a broader deployment by the ships to South-East Asia and the Pacific.

Citations

References

Journal articles

News articles

Press releases

Hobart-class destroyers
2015 ships
Ships built in South Australia